Common phrases may refer to:

 Catchphrase
 Cliché or "stock phrase"